Moongirl is an animated short produced in 2005 by Laika. It was written and directed by Henry Selick and features a score by They Might Be Giants. It is the first film, and currently the only short film, as well as the only non-stop-motion film, produced by the company.

Plot
Leon, a youthful boy is out fishing at night when the Moon goes dark. He is magically transported to the Moon, where he meets Moongirl, whom he helps try to fix the Moon.

Cast
  Avrielle Corti as Lorelei/Moongirl
 Zack Shada as Leon/Moonboy
 Henry Selick as Gargaloons

Production
The film came about after Laika held a contest for a short film idea. CG modeler Michael Berger's idea of a girl who controls the moon was chosen, and Selick was hired to develop the short. Selick brought on They Might Be Giants to do the score after connecting with them through Courtney Booker, who worked on the music video for "Bastard Wants to Hit Me".

In May 2004, Laika president Travis Knight's brother, Matthew, died suddenly, and the film was dedicated to his memory.

Release
The film premiered at the Ottawa International Film Festival on September 24, 2005. The film was also shown with October 2005 screenings of Selick's previous work The Nightmare Before Christmas at El Capitan Theatre.

The film was adapted into a picture book which was written by Selick and illustrated by Peter Chan and Courtney Booker. The book, which was released on September 12, 2006, included a DVD copy of the film.

Accolades
The film has won awards at multiple film festivals, including the Short Film Special Jury Prize at the Ottawa International Film Festival, the Grand Owl Award, Best Animation at the Fantasy Worldwide International Film Festival, Best Animated Short at the Los Angeles International Children's Film Festival, Best Animated Film at Memphis International Film Festival and Best Animated Film at San Fernando Valley International Film Festival.

References

External links
 

2000s American animated films
2000s animated short films
2005 fantasy films
2005 animated films
2005 films
American children's animated fantasy films
Films directed by Henry Selick
Focus Features animated films
Laika (company) animated films
Moon in film
Stop-motion animated short films
They Might Be Giants
2000s English-language films